Radical 141 or radical tiger meaning "tiger" is one of the 29 Kangxi radicals (214 radicals in total) composed of 6 strokes.

In the Kangxi Dictionary, there are 114 characters (out of 49,030) to be found under this radical.

 is also the 130th indexing component in the Table of Indexing Chinese Character Components predominantly adopted by Simplified Chinese dictionaries published in mainland China, with  being its associated indexing component.

Evolution

Derived characters

Literature

External links

Unihan Database - U+864D

141
130